Cléry is the name or part of the name of the following communes in France:

 Cléry, Côte-d'Or, in the Côte-d'Or department
 Cléry, Savoie, in the Savoie department
 Cléry-en-Vexin, in the Val-d'Oise department
 Cléry-le-Grand, in the Meuse department
 Cléry-le-Petit, in the Meuse department
 Cléry-Saint-André, in the Loiret department
 Cléry-sur-Somme, in the Somme department
 Mézières-lez-Cléry, in the Loiret department